The 1908 WAFL season was the 24th season of senior Australian rules football in Perth, Western Australia.

Ladder

Finals

First semi-final

Second semi-final

Grand Final

References

West Australian Football League seasons
WAFL